Government Inter College may refer to:

Aditya Nath Jha Government Inter College, Rudrapur
GIC Deoria
Government Inter College Barabanki
Government Inter College Faizabad
Government Inter College Noida
Prabhu Narayan Government Inter College

See also
Government Girls Inter College, Dildar Nagar